Holmenkollen is a mountain and a neighbourhood in the Vestre Aker borough of Oslo, Norway.

Overview
In addition to being a residential area, the area has been a ski recreation area since the late 19th century, with its famous ski jumping hill, the Holmenkollbakken, hosting competitions since 1892. To the north, the area borders to the woodlands area Marka.

The Holmenkoll Line of the Oslo Metro runs through the neighborhood, serving the stations Besserud and Holmenkollen.

The Holmenkollen Chapel was destroyed by arson in August 1992 by black metal artists Varg Vikernes, Bård “Faust” Eithun and Øystein “Euronymous” Aarseth, but later rebuilt.

The chapel is a neighbour to the Norwegian Royal Lodge, the residence of the Norwegian Royal Family during events like Christmas and Holmenkollen Ski Festival.

Climate
Holmenkollen has a humid continental climate transitional with maritime subarctic influenced by its elevated position above the valley consisting of Oslo's downtown. It has cooler weather than the lower elevations, especially in summer and more precipitation both in terms of rain and snow because of orographic lift. Winter temperatures are slightly colder than in lower areas, although the difference is lower that time of the year. Even so, Holmenkollen usually maintains a sizeable snowpack. In spite of the elevation, summer temperatures are comparable to sea level locations on the North Sea both in Norway and Scotland.

Etymology
The name is a compound of the farm name Holmen and the finite form of kolle m 'hill, rounded mountain top'. The farm name Holmen (Norse Holmin, from originally *Holmvin) is a compound of holmr m 'bedrock' and vin f 'meadow'.

In fiction

Large parts of the plot of Jo Nesbø's mystery novel The Snowman—particularly the book's final climactic scenes—are set in Holmenkollen, both the residential area and the ski jump.

See also
 FIS Nordic World Ski Championships 2011 in Holmenkollen
 Holmenkollbakken
 Holmenkollen medal
 Holmenkollen ski festival

References

 
Neighbourhoods of Oslo
Ski areas and resorts in Norway
Mountains of Oslo